Norbert Weisser (born 1946) is a German-born actor who has been based in the United States since the mid-1960s.

Career
Based in Los Angeles, Weisser is a founding member of Odyssey Theatre Ensemble, the ProVisional Theater, and the Padua Playwrights Festival. A long-time collaborator of Murray Mednick, he originated the role of the Trickester in the playwright's epic seven-hour Coyote Cycle, and has starred in numerous American and European theatrical productions, including opposite Ed Harris in Ronald Harwood's Taking Sides and John O'Keefe's Times Like These, where he received an Ovation Award, an LA Weekly Theater Award and an L.A. Drama Critics Circle Award nomination for his performance. He has also directed plays at the Magic Theatre in San Francisco and at the Mark Taper Forum.

Besides his extensive stage work, Weisser is also a prolific film and television actor, with over 90 credits to his name. Chiefly a character actor, he has starred in well-known and acclaimed films including Midnight Express, The Thing, Chaplin, Schindler's List, and Pollock, and numerous titles directed by Albert Pyun. He had a memorable guest role in "Madrigal" (a fifth season episode of Breaking Bad), reprised in Better Call Saul, and had provided voice-over and motion capture to a number of video games such as Medal of Honor: Allied Assault and Wolfenstein II: The New Colossus.

Personal life
Weisser lives in Venice, Los Angeles, California with his wife Tandy. His son Morgan Weisser is also an actor.

Theatre credits

Filmography

Video games

References

External links
 
 

1946 births
Living people
German male film actors
German male stage actors
American male film actors
American male stage actors
German emigrants to the United States